Ch. Gunnepalle is a village in Mummidivaram Mandal, Dr. B.R. Ambedkar Konaseema district in the state of Andhra Pradesh in India.

Geography 
Ch.

Demographics 
 India census, Ch. Gunnepalle had a population of 3409, out of which 1740 were male and 1669 were female. The population of children below 6 years of age was 9%. The literacy rate of the village was 79%.

References 

Villages in Mummidivaram mandal